The Langtang Glacier is a short glacier in Nepal, located in Langtang in the Himalayan mountains. It is the longest glacier river of Nepal.

References

Bagmati Province
Glaciers of Nepal